George Rowland Blades, 1st Baron Ebbisham, GBE (15 April 1868 – 24 May 1953) was an English Conservative politician, printer, and Lord Mayor of London.

Blades was born in Sydenham, Kent, and educated at King's College School. In 1886, he joined the family printing business, Blades, East & Blades Ltd, which had been founded by his grandfather, rising to become its chairman.

In 1913 he was elected to the Corporation of London. He served as Sheriff of London from 1917 to 1918 and during his term of office was knighted when the King and Queen visited the City of London to celebrate their silver wedding. He was elected as Lord Mayor of London for 1926–27.

On 23 April 1918 he was co-opted as a member of the London County Council for the Municipal Reform Party, representing the City of London.

In 1918 he was elected to Parliament for Epsom and held the seat until 1928, when he resigned by taking the Chiltern Hundreds. He was created a Baronet in the 1922 New Year Honours and appointed Knight Grand Cross of the Order of the British Empire (GBE) in September 1927. In 1928 he was raised to the peerage as Baron Ebbisham, the old name of Epsom (since the title of Baron Epsom was already held by the Earl of Rosebery).

He was interested in cricket and in 1921 hosted a dinner at the House of Commons for J. H. Mason, captain of the touring Philadelphia Pilgrims.

Arms

Footnotes

References
Obituary, The Times, 25 May 1953

External links 
 

1868 births
1953 deaths
People educated at King's College School, London
People from Sydenham, London
English printers
Blades, Rowland
Blades, Rowland
Blades, Rowland
Blades, Rowland
Blades, Rowland
Blades, Rowland
Blades, Rowland
UK MPs who were granted peerages
Barons in the Peerage of the United Kingdom
Knights Grand Cross of the Order of the British Empire
Blades, Rowland
Members of London County Council
Municipal Reform Party politicians
Barons created by George V